Ray Shaw (born c. 1946) is an American politician who served as a member of the Montana House of Representatives for the District 71 from 2013 to 2021.

Education 
Shaw attended Montana Tech and University of Montana.

Career 
In military, Shaw served in the United States Air Force. Shaw is a businessman and owner of Rubystone Resources.

On November 6, 2012, Shaw won the election and became a Republican member of Montana House of Representatives for District 71. Shaw defeated Kim Miller and Donald J. Lewinsky with 56.93% of the votes. On November 4, 2014, as an incumbent, Shaw won the election and continued serving District 71. Shaw defeated Johanna Lester with 73.89% of the votes. On November 8, 2016, as an incumbent, Shaw won the election unopposed and continued serving District 71. On November 6, 2018, as an incumbent, Shaw won the election and continued serving District 71. Shaw defeated Jay A. Frederick and Michael White with 57.90% of the votes.

Awards 
 2019 Patriot Award. Presented by Major General Matt Quinn at the Montana Youth Challenge Academy.
 2019 Distinguished Service Golden Plow Award. Presented by Montana Farm Bureau Federation.

Personal life 
Shaw has three children. Shaw and his family live in Sheridan, Montana.

References

External links 
 Ray Shaw at leg.mt.gov
 Ray Shaw at ballotpedia.org
 Ray L. Shaw at ourcampaigns.com
 Ray Shaw at meic.org
 Capitol Connections: Rep. Ray Shaw on Advocating for Veterans (February 8, 2017)

Living people
1940s births
Republican Party members of the Montana House of Representatives
21st-century American politicians